Kim Kyoung-hee (born January 20, 1972), better known by her stage name So Chan-whee, is a South Korean singer, best known for her 2000 song, "Tears".

Personal
Kim dated Roy of the Street Guns band (previously known as The RockTigers) in 2014. On January 1, 2017, their agency announced their upcoming marriage in the earlier half of that year. Kim and Roy were married on April 25, 2017.

Discography

Albums 
 Cherish, 1996
 Then To Now, 1997
 Another..., 1998
 First Bridge, March 2000
 Red Change, 2001
 Beginning, 2002
 The True, 2005
 The Begin Again, 2006

OSTs 
 KBS: Thank you, Life! aka: Gracias à la vida OST, 2006
 Born To Be Free OST Witch's Court, 2017
 "Bad Girls" OST Red Shoes, 2021

References

Further reading

"'90s icon So Chan-whee relishes return to spotlight" (2015), The Korea Herald.

External links 
 
 So Chan-whee at Empas People
 So Chan-whee at YesAsia

1972 births
Living people
South Korean women pop singers
South Korean pop rock singers
21st-century South Korean singers
21st-century South Korean women singers